The 2008 Philippine Basketball Association (PBA) Fiesta Conference, also known as the 2008 Smart PBA Fiesta Conference for sponsorship reasons, was the last conference of the 2007-08 PBA season. The tournament began on March 29 with a game between the Coca-Cola Tigers and the Talk 'N Text Phone Pals at Panabo, Davao del Norte. Opening ceremonies were held the day after at the Araneta Coliseum.

All ten teams are permitted to acquire one non-Filipino (the "import") of unlimited height as reinforcement.

Tournament format
Double round eliminations. Worst team would be eliminated.
Sixth- to ninth-best teams figure in the one-game wildcard playoffs.
Sixth seed vs. Ninth seed
Seventh seed vs. Eighth seed
Winners will figure in a playoff to advance to the quarterfinals.
Third- to fifth-best teams, and the winner of the wildcards advance to the best-of-three quarterfinals.
Third seed vs. winner of wildcards.
Fourth seed vs. fifth seed.
The two best teams and the winners of the quarterfinals advance to the best-of-seven semifinals.
First seed vs. winner of the third seed/wildcard winner quarterfinal series
Second seed vs. winner of the fourth seed/fifth seed quarterfinal series
The winners of the semifinals advance to the best-of-seven Finals; the losers figure in a one-game third-place playoff.

Elimination round

Team standings

Schedule

Bracket

Wildcard phase

First round

Second round

Quarterfinals

(3) Barangay Ginebra vs. (9) Sta. Lucia

(4) Coca-Cola vs. (5) Magnolia

Semifinals

(1) Air21 vs. (5) Magnolia

(2) Red Bull vs. (3) Barangay Ginebra

Third place playoff

Finals

Awards
Finals Most Valuable Player: Ronald Tubid and Eric Menk (Barangay Ginebra)
Best Player of the Conference: Jayjay Helterbrand (Barangay Ginebra)
Best Import of the Conference: Chris Alexander (Barangay Ginebra)
Players of the Week:
March 29-April 6: Kelly Williams (Sta. Lucia)
April 7–13: Danny Seigle (Magnolia)
April 14–20: Cyrus Baguio (Red Bull)
April 22-May 4: Mark Cardona (Talk 'N Text)
May 5–11: Asi Taulava (Coca-Cola) & Rob Wainwright (Welcoat)
May 12–18: Willie Miller (Alaska)
May 19–25: Mark Caguioa (Barangay Ginebra)
May 26-June 1: Gary David (Air21)
June 2–8: Jayjay Helterbrand (Barangay Ginebra)
June 9–15: Jayjay Helterbrand (Barangay Ginebra)
June 16–22: Lordy Tugade (Magnolia) & Ren-Ren Ritualo (Talk 'N Text)
June 23–29: Jayjay Helterbrand (Barangay Ginebra)
June 30–July 6: Gary David (Air21) & Mark Caguioa (Barangay Ginebra)
July 7–July 13: Joseph Yeo (Sta. Lucia)
July 14–July 20: none
July 21–July 27: Mark Caguioa (Barangay Ginebra)
July 28–August 3: Gary David (Air21)

Imports
The following is the list of imports, which had played for their respective teams at least once, with the returning imports in italics. Highlighted are the imports who stayed with their respective teams for the whole conference.

External links
Philippine Basketball Association official website

Fiesta Conference
PBA Fiesta Conference